The District of Potisje ( or ) was an administrative territorial entity of the Habsburg monarchy. It was formed in 1751 with headquarters in Stari Bečej, and existed for almost one century (until 1848).

History

Before the formation of the district, its territory was part of the Tisa-Moriš section of the Military Frontier and was mainly inhabited by ethnic Serbs. After the abolishment of this part of the Frontier, many Serbs left from the area and immigrated to Russian Empire (notably to New Serbia and Slavo-Serbia). Some of them also settled in Banat.

The three privileges were given to the district in 1759, 1774, and 1800, and were published for those frontiersmen (Serbs) that did not emigrated to Russian Empire or Banat. The first privilege of the District defined its autonomous status, while the second one allowed to ethnic Hungarians to settle in the district. Serbs opposed this settling of Hungarians in Serb settlements and in some places ethnic clashes between the two groups occurred. For example, the first Hungarian house built in Martonoš was demolished by Serbs. The ethnic balance in much of the area was, however, changed in favor of the Hungarians.

Administratively, the District of Potisje was part of the Batsch-Bodrog County within the Habsburg Kingdom of Hungary. After abolishment of the district (in 1848), its territory was incorporated into autonomous Serbian Vojvodina.

Municipalities

The District included 14 municipalities:
Ada
Bečej
Kanjiža
Martonoš
Mol
Petrovo Selo
Senta
Sentomaš
Turija
Feldvarac
Gospođinci
Stari Kovilj
Novi Kovilj
Čurug

In 1796, last four municipalities were excluded from the District and included into Military Frontier (Šajkaš Battalion).

See also
Potisje
District of Velika Kikinda

References
Dr Dušan J. Popović, Srbi u Vojvodini, knjiga 2, Novi Sad, 1990.

External links
History of Bečej (in Serbian)
History of Bečej (in Serbian)

History of Bačka
Vojvodina under Habsburg rule
1751 establishments in the Habsburg monarchy
1848 disestablishments in the Austrian Empire